DNA polymerase subunit gamma (POLG or POLG1) is an enzyme that in humans is encoded by the POLG gene. Mitochondrial DNA polymerase is heterotrimeric, consisting of a homodimer of accessory subunits plus a catalytic subunit. The protein encoded by this gene is the catalytic subunit of mitochondrial DNA polymerase.  Defects in this gene are a cause of progressive external ophthalmoplegia with mitochondrial DNA deletions 1 (PEOA1), sensory ataxic neuropathy dysarthria and ophthalmoparesis (SANDO), Alpers-Huttenlocher syndrome (AHS), and mitochondrial neurogastrointestinal encephalopathy syndrome (MNGIE).

Structure 
POLG is located on the q arm of chromosome 15 in position 26.1 and has 23 exons. The POLG gene produces a 140 kDa protein composed of 1239 amino acids. POLG, the protein encoded by this gene, is a member of the DNA polymerase type-A family. It is a mitochondrion nucleiod with an Mg2+ cofactor and 15 turns, 52 beta strands, and 39 alpha helixes. POLG contains a polyglutamine tract near its N-terminus that may be polymorphic. Two transcript variants encoding the same protein have been found for this gene.

Function 

POLG is a gene that codes for the catalytic subunit of the mitochondrial DNA polymerase, called DNA polymerase gamma. The human POLG cDNA and gene were cloned and mapped to chromosome band 15q25.  In eukaryotic cells, the mitochondrial DNA is replicated by DNA polymerase gamma, a trimeric protein complex composed of a catalytic subunit, POLG, and a dimeric accessory subunit of 55 kDa encoded by the POLG2 gene.  The catalytic subunit contains three enzymatic activities, a DNA polymerase activity, a 3’-5’ exonuclease activity that proofreads misincorporated nucleotides, and a 5’-dRP lyase activity required for base excision repair.

Catalytic activity 
Deoxynucleoside triphosphate + DNA(n) = diphosphate + DNA(n+1).

Clinical significance 

Mutations in the POLG gene are associated with several mitochondrial diseases, progressive external ophthalmoplegia with mitochondrial DNA deletions 1 (PEOA1), sensory ataxic neuropathy dysarthria and ophthalmoparesis (SANDO), Alpers-Huttenlocher syndrome (AHS), and mitochondrial neurogastrointestinal encephalopathy syndrome (MNGIE). Pathogenic variants have also been linked with fatal congenital myopathy and gastrointestinal pseudo-obstruction and fatal infantile hepatic failure. A list of all published mutations in the POLG coding region and their associated disease can be found at the Human DNA Polymerase Gamma Mutation Database.

Mice heterozygous for a Polg mutation are only able to replicate their mitochondrial DNA inaccurately, so that they sustain a 500-fold higher mutation burden than normal mice.  These mice show no clear features of rapidly accelerated aging, indicating that mitochondrial mutations do not have a causal role in natural aging.

Interactions 
POLG has been shown to have 50 binary protein-protein interactions including 32 co-complex interactions. POLG appears to interact with POLG2, Dlg4, Tp53, and Sod2.

References

Further reading

External links 
  GeneReviews/NCBI/NIH/UW entry on POLG-Related Disorders

DNA replication